Ivan Bokyi (1942 – March 24, 2020) was a Ukrainian journalist and politician who served as a Deputy of the Verkhovna Rada between 1998 and 2007.

Bokyi was born in Hlobyne, Poltava, and graduated from the Taras Shevchenko National University of Kyiv. Bokyi worked as a journalist prior to his election to the Verkhovna Rada in 1998 on the party list of the Socialist Party – Peasant Party. He later formally joined the Socialist Party of Ukraine, and represented the party in the parliament through 2007. 

Bokyi died on 24 March 2020, aged 78.

References

People from Poltava Oblast
Ukrainian journalists
Third convocation members of the Verkhovna Rada
Fourth convocation members of the Verkhovna Rada
Fifth convocation members of the Verkhovna Rada
Socialist Party of Ukraine politicians
Taras Shevchenko National University of Kyiv alumni
20th-century Ukrainian writers
Ukrainian male writers
1942 births
2020 deaths
Male journalists